Edward Talbot, 8th Earl of Shrewsbury, 8th Earl of Waterford (christened 25 February 1561 – 8 February 1617), was the younger brother and nearest male heir of Gilbert Talbot, 7th Earl of Shrewsbury, whom he succeeded as Earl of Shrewsbury and Lord High Steward of Ireland in 1616.

Life 
He was born in Sheffield, the son of George Talbot, 6th Earl of Shrewsbury, by the latter's first marriage to Gertrude Manners, daughter of first Earl of Rutland. He entered Magdalen College, Oxford, in 1579. Edward and his brother Henry Talbot (1563–1596) had an audience with Queen Elizabeth in November 1580.

He served twice as Knight of the Shire (MP) for Northumberland in 1584 and 1586. He was a JP for Northumberland from c. 1592 and appointed Sheriff of Northumberland for 1601 and 1609. He was a member of the Council of the North from 1603 until his death in 1618. He died in London in his 57th year and was buried in Westminster Abbey.

In 1583 he married Joane Ogle, Baroness Ogle, the daughter of Cuthbert Ogle, 7th Baron Ogle. None of their children survived him, and he was succeeded by his nearest male relative, George Talbot of Grafton who became the 9th Earl. However, some of the extensive family estates passed to the daughters of his elder brother and predecessor and devolved ultimately to the Dukes of Norfolk.

References

External links

Attribution

1561 births
1617 deaths
Politicians from Sheffield
Edward
17th-century English nobility
High Sheriffs of Northumberland
English MPs 1584–1585
English MPs 1586–1587
16th-century English nobility
Earls of Shrewsbury
Earls of Waterford
Burials at Westminster Abbey